An open compensation plan (or system or policy) is one with a defined pay scale and no rules about keeping employee pay confidential. Open compensation plans are noted for reducing employee turnover.
One example of an organization with an open compensation system is the U.S. military.

External links
An example open compensation plan for software professionals
Employment compensation